The Political Unconscious: Narrative as a Socially Symbolic Act is a 1981 book by the Marxist literary theorist Fredric Jameson. Often cited as a powerful overview and methodological guide, it is the work with which Jameson made his greatest impact. The book has been the subject of a commentary, Jameson, Althusser, Marx (1984), by William C. Dowling, who believes that its main idea had been previously outlined by Terry Eagleton and notes that it is influenced by such thinkers as A. J. Greimas, Northrop Frye, Hans-Georg Gadamer, and Claude Lévi-Strauss. Jameson's interpretive framework, including his post-Lacanian idea of unconscious ideology and his invocation of structural causality to reconcile Marxist and post-Marxist perspectives, was largely borrowed from Louis Althusser.

The book opens with one of Jameson's most famous bons mots, 'Always historicise!'.

References

1981 non-fiction books
American non-fiction books
Books by Fredric Jameson
English-language books
Marxist works
Books about literary theory